China–Mauritania relations refer to the bilateral relations between China and Mauritania. China and Mauritania established diplomatic relations on July 19, 1965. China has an embassy in Nouakchott. Mauritania has an embassy in Beijing.

History
The government of Mauritania enjoys close ties with the government of the People's Republic of China. In recent years, they have signed a series of agreements and exchanged a series of diplomatic gestures that have strengthened their relationship.
The Chinese government has recently shown particular interest in Mauritania's oil deposits. Oil production in Mauritania began in February 2006, and by May of the same year the Chinese and Mauritanian governments signed an agreement on social and economic cooperation. In October 2006, the state-owned China National Petroleum Corporation began drilling oil wells in Mauritania, and has three other prospecting permits in Mauritania. The Mauritanian government sees oil production as a significant means of boosting economic growth.

During the campaign for Mauritania's presidential elections in March 2007, candidate Sidi Ould Cheikh Abdallahi praised Mauritania's growing ties with China, promising to "continue the path of strengthening the bilateral relations with all my efforts".

Human rights
In June 2020, Mauritania was one of 53 countries that backed the Hong Kong national security law at the United Nations.

Chinese development finance to Mauritania
From 2000 to 2012, there are approximately 15 Chinese official development finance projects identified in Mauritania through various media reports. These projects range from extending the Nouakchott Port by 900 meters through a preferential loan of 2 billion Chinese yuan from China's Ex-Im Bank, to a loan of US$136 million from Chinese government to construct a new international airport at Nouakchott.

References

 
Mauritania
Bilateral relations of Mauritania